"Poor Boy" was a song written by Tim Finn and recorded by Split Enz for their 1980 True Colours album. It was released as a single in the UK only.

The song 

The lyrics concerned a young man who had fallen in love with a girl on another planet, who he had only discovered existed when tuning his radio, and his regret that they will never meet face to face. The song made use of an ethereal keyboard solo by Eddie Rayner.

In popular culture
In 2009 a Melbourne Theatre Company production of the same name redeveloped the song's themes, with the other-worldly character presented as the ghost of a car accident.

Track listing 

Released in the United Kingdom only.
"Poor Boy" 3:28
"Missing Person (Live)" 3:39

Personnel 

 Tim Finn - vocals
 Neil Finn - vocals, guitar
 Noel Crombie - percussion
 Malcolm Green - drums
 Nigel Griggs - bass
 Eddie Rayner - vocals, keyboards

ENZSO version 

"Poor Boy" is a song by Enzso, released as the first single from their album Enzso. With the B-sides "I See Red", which is available on the album, and "Albert of India".

Track listing
"Poor Boy" - Dave Dobbyn
"I See Red" - Tim Finn
"Albert of India" - Eddie Rayner

References

Split Enz songs
1980 singles
Songs written by Tim Finn
1995 singles
Enzso songs
1980 songs
Mushroom Records singles